The Men's 3 m springboard competition of the 2022 European Aquatics Championships was held on 20 August 2022.

Results

The preliminary round was started at 10:00. The final round was held at 16:37. 

Green denotes finalists

References

Diving